A dolphin is a group of pilings arrayed together to serve variously as a protective hardpoint along a dock, in a waterway, or along a shore; as a means or point of stabilization of a dock, bridge, or similar structure; as a mooring point; and as a base for navigational aids.

Structure 
Dolphins typically consist of a number of piles driven into the seabed or riverbed, and connected above the water level to provide a platform or fixing point. The piles can be untreated  or pressure treated timber piles, or steel or reinforced concrete piles. Smaller dolphins can have the piles drawn together with wire rope, but larger dolphins are typically fixed using a reinforced concrete capping or a structural steel frame.

Access to a dolphin may be via a pedestrian bridge, particularly in the case of mooring dolphins, but is often by boat.

Use

As mooring point
Dolphins are usually installed to provide a fixed structure when it would be impractical to extend the shore to provide a dry-access facility, for example, when the number of ships is greater than can be accommodated by the length of the berth/pier. Typical uses include extending a berth (a berthing dolphin) or providing a mooring point (a mooring dolphin).

To protect structures
Dolphins are also used to protect structures from possible impact by ships, in a similar fashion to boating fenders. A notable example of dolphins used to protect a bridge is the Sunshine Skyway Bridge across the mouth of Tampa Bay. In 1980, the MV Summit Venture hit a pier on one of the bridge's two, two-lane spans causing a  section of the bridge to fall into the water, resulting in 35 deaths. When a replacement span was designed, a top priority was to prevent ships from colliding with the new bridge. The new bridge is protected by 36 dolphins: four large dolphins protecting the two main pylons supporting the cable-stayed main span plus 32 smaller dolphins protecting bridge piers for  mi ( km) to either side of the main span. The cost of the dolphins was $41 million (approximately $90 million in 2017 dollars).

To support navigational aids
Dolphins are also used to house navigation aids such as lights or daybeacons, and display regulatory information such as speed limits and other safety information, or advertising.

See also

Starling (structure) - a protective base for bridge piers

References 

Nonbuilding structures
Nautical terminology